This is a bibliography of some of the novels, the poems and articles of the author Emyr Humphreys and some of the books written about him.

Novels 

 The Little Kingdom; Eyre and Spottiswoode, London. (1946). (Translated into Welsh as Darn o Dir by W. J. Jones (Gwilym Fychan); Gwasg Gwynedd, Penygroes (1986) )
 The Voice of A Stranger; Eyre and Spottiswoode, London, (1949).
 A Change of Heart; Eyre and Spottiswoode, London. (1951).
 Hear and Forgive; Victor Edlancz, London, (1952).
 A Man's Estate; Eyre and Spottiswoode, London, (1955): Dent, London. (1988); and Parthian, Cardigan (2006) . (Translated into Welsh as Etifedd y Glyn by W. J. Jones (Gwilym Fychan) Gwasg Gomer (1981) . The translation was adapted into a television drama called  Brodyr a Chwiorydd (Brothers and Sisters) . Broadcast on S4C between 3 and 24 April 1994  )
 The Italian Wife; Eyre and Spottiswoode, London (1957).
 A Toy Epic; Eyre and Spottiswoode, London, (1958); and Seren, Bridgend, (1989) . (Translated into Welsh as Y Tri Llais by Humphreys in 1958 republished by Cyhoeddiadau Mei in 1985  
 The Gift; Eyre and Spottiswoode, London, (1963).
 Outside the House of Baal; Eyre and Spottiswoode, London. (1965) and Seren, Bridgend. (1996) 
 The Anchor Tree; Hodder and Stoughton, London, (1980).
 Jones; Dent, London. (1984).
 Unconditional Surrender; Seren, Bridgend, (1996) 
 The Gift of a Daughter; Seren, Bridgend, (1998). 
 The Shop; Seren, Bridgend, (2005).

The Land of the Living series
 Flesh and Blood; Hodder and Stoughton, London. (1974); Sphere. (1986); and University of Wales Press, Cardiff, (1999).  
 The Best of Friends; Hodder and Stoughton, London, (1978) ; Sphere, (1987)  and University of Wales Press, Cardiff, (1999).
 Salt of the Earth; Dent, London. (1985) ; and University of Wales Press, Cardiff. (1999).
 An Absolute Hero; Dent, London, (1986); Sphere, (1988)  and University of Wales Press, Cardiff, (2000) .
 Open Secrets; Sphere (1989) 
 National Winner; Macdonald, London. (1971) ; Sphere (1990)   and University of Wales Press, Cardiff, (2000) .
 Bonds of Attachment; University of Wales Press, Cardiff, (2001)

Short stories

Collections 
 Natives; Seeker and Warburg, London, (1968) 
 A Mystical Experience
 The Rigours of Inspection**
 The Hero**
 The Suspect
 With All My Heart
 An Artistic Mission
 A List of Good People
 Mels Secret Love"
 Dinas (City)
 A Cheerful Note
 Miscellany Two; Poetry Wales Press, Bridgend (1981) 
 Boys in a Boat
 A Corner of a Field
 Down in the Heel
 The Arrest
 Ghosts and Strangers; Seren, Bridgend (2001) 
Lady Ramrod
 Ghosts and Strangers
 Melina
 Penrhyn Hen**
 Old People Are a Problem; Seren, Bridgend. (2003) 
 Old People Are a Problem
 Before the War
 The Man in the Mist
 The Arrest
 Sisters
 An Ethnic Tremor
 Looking After Ruthie
 Glasshouses
 The Woman at the Window, Seren, Bridgend (2009)  
The Grudge
The Woman at the Window
Rendezvous
The CometLuigiVennerberg's GhostNomenHomeThe Ring and the BookThe Garden CottageThree Old Men Individual short stories 
The New Statesman:A Girl on the Ice; (1953).The Obstinate Bottle; (1953).
Welsh Short Stories, ed. G. Ewart Evans; London: Faber. (1959):Mrs Armitage; pp.  246–59.
The Shining Pyramid. ed. Sam Adams a Roland Mathias; Gwasg Gomer, Llandysul (1970)The Rigours of Inspection; pp.  135–46.
The Penguin Book of Welsh Short Stories; ed. Alun Richards; Penguin. (1976):Mel's Secret Love; pp.  318–58.
Mabon I; Gwasg Gee. (1978):The Arrest.
The Green Bridge, ed. John Davies; Seren, Bridgend. (1988):The Arrest; pp. 197–208.
The New Penguin Book of Welsh Short Stories, ed. Alun Lewis; Viking. (1993):The Suspect; pp. 243–64.
Planet:Penrhyn Hen. A Short Story – Part I; (February/ March 1997), pp. 42–57.Penrhyn Hen. A Short Story – Part II; (April/May 1997), pp. 63–74.An Ethnic Tremor; (April/May 1999), pp. 17–26.Vennerberg's Ghost; (April/May 2000), pp. 47–59.Luigi; (June/July 2002), pp. 73–78.Nomen; (June/July 2003), pp. 27–30.The Grudge; (October/November 2006), pp 18–29.Rendezvous; (February/ March 2008). pp. 51–59.

PoetryAncestor Worship; Gwasg Gee, (1970). Landscapes: A Sequence of Songs; Chimera Press, (1979) (Music by Alun Hoddinot) Penguin Modern Poets Rhif 27 John Ormond, Emyr Humphreys, John Tripp; Penguin, London:. (1979) The Kingdom of Bran; Keith Holmes, London (1979).Miscellany 2; Poetry Wales Press, Bridgend (1981).Collected Poems; University of Wales Press, Cardiff, (1999) Shards of Light; University of Wales Press, Cardiff, (2018)  

 Drama 

 Outside Time  Channel 4 Television (1991) (Broadcast on Channel 4 on 3 September 1991, as Outside Time: Alternative Heroes Directed by his son Siôn Humphreys)

Non-fictionTheatr Saunders Lewis (Astudiaethau Theatr Cymru); Cymdeithas Theatr Cymru (1979)The Triple Net: A portrait of the writer Kate Roberts 1891–1985; Channel 4 Television, (1988)  The Taliesin Tradition: A Quest for the Welsh Identity; Seren, Bridgend, (1989) The Crucible of Myth; Swansea University, (1990).Dal Pen Rheswm: Cyfweliadau Gydag Emyr Humphreys;  (Making Sense: Interviews with Emyr Williams) Jones, R Arwel, University of Wales Press, Cardiff (1999) Emyr Humphreys: Conversations and Reflections with M. Wynn Thomas ; ed. M. Wynn Thomas; University of Wales Press, Cardiff, (2002). 

 Papers by Emyr Humphreys and his work 

 "Replies to "Wales" Questionnaire", Wales, Vol. VI, Nø 23, 26 August 1946, p. 27.
 "A Season in Florence : 1945", Wales, Vol. VI, Nø 24, 1946, pp. 120-124.
 Emyr Humphreys, Wales, Vol. VII, Nø 26, Caernarfon, June 1947, p. 264.
 "Michaels Edwards: The Nationalist at College", Two Chapters from a New Novel, Wales, Vol. VII, Nø 26, 1947, pp. 265-280.
 "Michaels Edwards at College", Chapters Three and Four, Wales, Vol. VII, Nø 27, 1947, pp. 343-363.
 "A Protestant View of the Modern Novel", radio talk recorded at Bangor in March 1953, The Listener, Vol. XLIX, Nø 1257, 2 April 1953, pp. 557-559.
 "The Welsh Novel", Ysgrifennu cyfoes yng Nghymru, I. Y nofel. (Contemporary writing in Wales, I. The novel), Lleufer 18, 1, Wales, 1962, pp.4-8.
 "Outside the House of Baal", Mabon, 1965, pp. 30-40.
 "The Welsh Condition", A Plaid Cymru Publication, reprinted from The Spectator, 28 March 1970, pp. 1-7.
 "The Welsh Condition", Annual Book of the Celtic League, Ed. F.G. Thompson, Eire, 1971, pp. 68-73.
 "In Love with an Island", The Spectator, in Personal Column, 22 August 1970, p. 181.
 "Outline of a Necessary Figure", Presenting Saunders Lewis, Edited by Alun R. Jones and Gwyn Thomas, University of Wales Press, Cardiff, 1973, pp. 6-13.
 "The Loss of Incantation", Welsh Music, Nø4 / 5, 1973 / 1974, pp. 67-73.
 "Two Episodes", Planet, Nø 39, August 1977, pp. 24-34.
 "Poetry, Prison and Propaganda", Planet, Nø 43, June / August 1978, pp. 17-23.
 "The Night of the Fire", Planet, Nø 49 / 50, January 1980, pp. 74-94.
 "Taliesin and Frank Lloyd Wright", Welsh Books & Writers (Llen A Llyfrau Cymru), Published by the Welsh Books Council (Cyngor Llyfrau Cymraeg), Aberystwyth, Dyfed, Wales, Autumn 1980, pp. 3-5.
 "A Perpetual Curate", The Powys Review, Nø8, Vol. II, 1980 / 1981, pp. 22-27, p. 91.
 "Chasing shadows", Arcade, Nø6, 1980 / 1981, p. 21.
 "Of poor Bertolt Brecht", Arcade, Nø17, 26 June / 9 July 1981, pp. 20-21.
 "Faith and a Nation's Fate", Arcade, Nø21, 4 / 17 September 1981, pp. 14-15.
 "The Road to Rhyl", Planet, Nø52, August / September 1985, pp. 81-82.
 "An Absolute Hero: Two chapters (ii / xiv) from Emyr Humphreys's forthcoming novel", Planet, Nø52, August / September 1985, pp. 83-96.
 "The Third Difficulty : Fact and Fiction ; the role of the novel in the age of the new media", S.A.E.S. Brest 9-11 mai 1986 - XXVI e Congrès, Université de Bretagne Occidentale, Brest, 1987, pp. 123-132.
 "The Third Difficulty", Pays de Galles, Ecosse, Irlande, Actes du Congrès de Brest - Mai 1986, Cahiers de Bretagne Occidentale, Nø 7, Société des Anglicistes de l'Enseignement Supérieur (S.A.E.S.), Centre de Recherche Bretonne et Celtique, UA 374 du CNRS, Faculté des Lettres et Sciences Sociales, Université de Bretagne Occidentale, Brest, 1987, pp. 3-16.
 "Under the Yoke", The New Welsh Review, Nø 3, Vol. 1, Winter 1988, pp. 9-13.
 "Fragile Threads", An extract from a new novel, Bonds of Attachment, Planet, Nø 77, October / November 1989, pp. 24-32.
 "The Crucible of Myth", W.D. Thomas Memorial Lecture, Published by University College of Swansea, Wales, 21 May 1990, pp. 1-20.
 "A Lost Leader ?", Emyr Humphreys on the Britishness of Huw Wheldon, Planet, Nø83, October / November 1990, pp. 3-11.
 "Open Secrets", in Discovering Welshness, Edited and introduced by Fiona Bowie and Oliver Davies, Published with the support of the Welsh Arts Council, Printed by Gomer Press, 1992, pp. 54-55.
 Emyr Humphreys's interviews, Caernarfon and Denbigh Herald, 12&19 August 1988.

Books about Emyr Humphreys and his workEmyr Humphreys (Writers of Wales); Williams Ioan; University of Wales Press, Cardiff, (1980) Llen y Llenor: Emyr Humphreys; Thomas, M. Wynn; Gwasg y Bwthyn, Caernarfon  Approaches to the Study of Emyr Humphreys' "Toy Epic"; Davies, Pam & Nicholas, Mary. Uned Iaith Genedlaethol Cymru (1994) The Fiction of Emyr Humphreys: Contemporary Critical Perspectives (Writing Wales in English); Peach, Lyndon; University of Wales Press, Cardiff (2011)  Emyr Humphreys (Writers of Wales); Thomas, M. Wynn; University of Wales Press, Cardiff, (2018)  Emyr Humphreys: A Postcolonial Novelist''; Green, Diane, Cardiff University of Wales Press (2009)  
 VANUXEEM, Marie, " Crise d'identité dans le roman d'expression anglaise de l'écrivain gallois Emyr Humphreys ", Thèse de doctorat en lettres, Université de Bretagne Occidentale, Faculté des Lettres, Département d'Anglais, Brest, 12 Décembre 1996.
This thesis is available in Wales at the Universities of Aberystwyth, Cardiff, Swansea, and in France at Université de Bretagne Occidentale UBO Brest and at Université de Lille - Atelier National de Reproduction des thèses http://www.diffusiontheses.fr/ .
 Books in French (Ouvrages en français) :
HUMPHREYS, Emyr, Ecoute et pardonne,
Roman traduit de l'anglais par Jacques et Jean Tournier, Editions Plon, Collection Feux Croisés, Paris, 1955.
Traduction du roman Hear and Forgive,
Référence Bibliothèque Nationale : fiche 449, In-16, 277 p. 570 fr. [D.L. 12748-55] [8ø Z. 24-206 (181)] -XcR-.

Papers about Emyr Humphreys and his work 

 A Complete Bibliography of Writing about Emyr Humphreys' novels :
HARRIS, John, (Dr), A Bibliographical Guide to Twenty-Four Modern Anglo-Welsh Writers, "Emyr Humphreys",
Aberystwyth College of Librarianship, University of Wales Press, Cardiff, 1994, pp. 103-118.
 A Complete Bibliography in the following thesis :
VANUXEEM, Marie, " Crise d'identité dans le roman d'expression anglaise de l'écrivain gallois Emyr Humphreys ", Thèse de doctorat en lettres, Université de Bretagne Occidentale, Faculté des Lettres, Département d'Anglais, Brest, 12 Décembre 1996.
 VANUXEEM, Marie, " Le roman social dans l'oeuvre d'Emyr Humphreys ", Revue d'Etudes Anglophones E-REA 2.2, Université de Provence (LERMA), Automne 2004. https://journals.openedition.org/erea/
 VANUXEEM, Marie, " The Protestant novel in Emyr Humphreys's fiction ", Not published, 2006. (available).
 THOMAS, M. Wynn, Internal Difference, Cardiff University of Wales Press, 1992.

References 

Bibliographies by writer
Bibliographies of British writers